A by-election for the Australian House of Representatives seat of Cunningham was triggered by the death, on 17 February 1956, of Labor MP Billy Davies. However, by the close of nominations on 11 April only one candidate, Labor's Victor Kearney, had nominated. Kearney was thus declared elected unopposed. This was the last time a federal MP was elected unopposed, with the exception of members for the Northern Territory who did not have full voting rights at this time.

Results

Billy Davies died.

References

1956 elections in Australia
New South Wales federal by-elections
Unopposed by-elections
1950s in New South Wales